Boulevard Theatre or Boulevard Theater may refer to:

Boulevard theatre (aesthetic), a theatrical aesthetic which emerged from the boulevards of Paris's old city
Boulevard Theatre (Jackson Heights, New York), a historic playhouse and movie theater in Queens, New York
Boulevardteatern, the Boulevard Theatre in Södermalm, Stockholm
Soho#Raymond_Revuebar, the upstairs of the Raymond Revuebar in Soho, London
Boulevard Theater (Miami), a former movie theater, now nightclub, in Miami, Florida